Babyloniidae is a taxonomic family of predatory sea snails, marine gastropod mollusks unassigned within the superfamily Neogastropoda.

Nomenclature
Three family-group names are older than Babyloniidae. Swainson based his concept of Eburninae on species of Babylonia, but he misidentified Eburna, the type species of which belongs to the family Olividae; under Art. 41 of the Code, the case should be resolved by the ICZN. Dipsaccinae and Latrunculinae are based on junior synonyms of Babylonia, none of which has been used in recent decades. However, Latrunculus has sporadically been used as valid shortly after 1899 (e.g. by Cossmann 1901 when he established the subfamily name), so that Babyloniidae cannot be protected automatically under ICZN Art. 23.9 (Reversal of precedence). The case has to be submitted to the ICZN to conserve the name Babyloniidae. [Bouchet & Rocroi 2005]

Genera and species
Genera and species within the Babyloniidae are as follows:
Babylonia F. Schlüter, 1838
 Zemiropsis Thiele, 1929
Genera brought into synonymy
 Dipsaccus H. Adams & A. Adams, 1853: synonym of Eburna Lamarck, 1801
 Galanthis Gistel, 1848: synonym of Babylonia Schlüter, 1838
 Latrunculus Gray, 1847: synonym of Babylonia Schlüter, 1838
 Peridipsaccus Rovereto, 1900: synonym of Babylonia Schlüter, 1838

Enemies
  The Babyloniidae are enemies with the common snail and are aggressive with them to the extent of breaking their shells and eating them.

References
 Fraussen K. & Stratmann D. (2013) The family Babyloniidae. In: G.T. Poppe & K. Groh (eds), A conchological iconography. Harxheim: Conchbooks. 96 pp., pls 1-48.

 
Gastropod families